James McKay Drinnan (28 May 1906 – 1936) was a Scottish professional footballer who played as an inside forward in the Football League, most notably for Brentford, Newport County and Luton Town.

Career statistics

References

Scottish footballers
Bristol City F.C. players
Merthyr Town F.C. players
Newport County A.F.C. players
Brentford F.C. players
Luton Town F.C. players
Burnley F.C. players
English Football League players
1906 births
1936 deaths
Larkhall Thistle F.C. players
Aberaman Athletic F.C. players
Worcester City F.C. players
Association football inside forwards